Vice President Johnson may refer to:
 Richard Mentor Johnson (1780–1850), 9th Vice President of the United States
 Andrew Johnson (1808–1875), 16th Vice President of the United States
 Lyndon B. Johnson (1908–1973), 37th Vice President of the United States